Alano Montanari was an Italian Grand Prix motorcycle road racer. His best year was in 1953 when he finished fifth in the 250cc world championship.

References 

Year of birth missing (living people)
Italian motorcycle racers
250cc World Championship riders
350cc World Championship riders
Place of birth missing (living people)
Living people